Maurice F. Rabb Jr. (August 7, 1932 – June 6, 2005) was an American ophthalmologist. He is widely known for his pioneering work in cornea and retinal vascular diseases.

Early life 
Maurice Farnandis Rabb was born on August 7, 1932 in Shelbyville, Kentucky. He was the only child of Maurice F. Rabb Sr., a physician and a civil rights activist, and Jewel Miller Rabb, a math teacher and treasurer of the local NAACP branch, both graduates of Fisk University. He was interested in traveling and taking pictures in his early ages. He and another member of the Boy Scouts represented their region at the Boy Scout World Jamboree in Paris. At 14, Rabb was thinking about a career in photography which led him to the field of ophthalmology.

After attending Indiana University in Bloomington for two years, Rabb transferred to the University of Louisville in 1951 when this institution was desegregated. He graduated from the University of Louisville School of Medicine in 1958. He attended Kings County Hospital for postgraduate training. He studied ophthalmology at New York University and became the first African-American resident of the University of Illinois Eye and Ear Infirmary.

Career 
When he completed his residency, Rabb started a private practice in downtown Chicago which focused on retinal disease.

Rabb became the medical director of the Illinois Eye Bank and Research Laboratory at the University of Illinois. He was also the director of the fluorescein angiography Laboratory at the Michael Reese Hospital. In 1977, he was a full professor of clinical ophthalmology.

He served as the chairman of the Department of Ophthalmology at Mercy Hospital, president of the Medical Hospital Mercy Staff, and medical director of Prevent Blindness America.

Rabb founded the Comprehensive Sickle Cell Center at the University of Illinois (The University of Illinois Eye and Ear Infirmary) with a colleague, after obtaining a grant from the National Institutes of Health. The center was the only one in the country to diagnose and treat sickle cell eye disease. Rabb also led a research that helped prevent retinal detachment and blindness in sickle cell patients.

Rabb was recognized for his efforts to expand opportunities for doctors from underrepresented communities through the National Medical Association. Annually, the NMA awards the Rabb Venable Ophthalmology Award for Outstanding Research to students and residents for the best research presentations. Rabb also was a member of the Roman Barnes Society of the American Academy of Ophthalmology.

Personal life
He was married to Madeline Murphy Rabb for 39 years. They have two sons, engineer and business person, Maurice III (1967) and politician and author Chris Rabb (1970).

Death
Rabb, a non-smoker, died on June 6, 2005 after a long battle with non-small cell lung cancer for which he was diagnosed in the winter of 2003.

References

Dr. Maurice F. Rabb Jr. Memorial website
Biography from "Breaking the Color Line in Medicine" by Lenworth N. Johnson, MD.
https://web.archive.org/web/20061027022640/http://www.aaregistry.com/african_american_history/2868/Dr_Maurice_Rabb_Jr_THE_ophthalmologist
http://www.thehistorymakers.com/biography/biography.asp?bioindex=90
http://www.factmonster.com/ipka/A0800432.html

1932 births
2005 deaths
People from Shelbyville, Kentucky
Deaths from lung cancer
American ophthalmologists
University of Louisville School of Medicine alumni
Central High School (Louisville, Kentucky) alumni